Acidicapsa borealis  is a Gram-negative, short rods and non-motile bacterium from the genus of Acidicapsa which has been isolated from sphagnum peat from the Tver Region in Russia.

References

External links
Type strain of Acidicapsa borealis at BacDive -  the Bacterial Diversity Metadatabase	

Acidobacteriota
Bacteria described in 2012